Makuria (Old Nubian: , Dotawo;) was a Nubian kingdom located in what is today Northern Sudan and Southern Egypt. Makuria originally covered the area along the Nile River from the Third Cataract to somewhere south of Abu Hamad as well as parts of northern Kordofan. Its capital was Dongola, and the kingdom is sometimes known by the name of its capital.

By the end of the 6th century, it had converted to Christianity, but in the 7th century, Egypt was conquered by the Islamic armies. In 651 an Arab army invaded, but it was repulsed and a treaty known as the Baqt was signed creating a relative peace between the two sides that lasted until the 13th century. Makuria expanded by annexing its northern neighbour Nobatia at some point in the seventh century, while also maintaining close dynastic ties with the kingdom of Alodia to the south. The period from the 9th to 11th century saw the peak of Makuria's cultural development: new monumental buildings were erected, arts like wall paintings and finely crafted and decorated pottery flourished and Nubian grew to become the prevalent written language.

Increased aggression from Egypt, internal discord, Bedouin incursions and possibly the plague and the shift of trade routes led to the state's decline in the 13th and 14th century. Due to a civil war in 1365, the kingdom was reduced to a rump state that lost much of its southern territories, including Dongola. It had disappeared by the 1560s, when the Ottomans occupied Lower Nubia. Nubia was subsequently Islamized, while the Nubians living upstream of Al Dabbah and in Kordofan were also Arabized.

Sources
Makuria is much better known than its neighbor Alodia to the south, but there are still many gaps in our knowledge. The most important source for the history of the area is various Arab travelers and historians who passed through Nubia during this period. These accounts are often problematic as many of the Arab writers were biased against their Christian neighbors. These works generally focus on only the military conflicts between Egypt and Nubia. One exception is Ibn Selim el-Aswani, an Egyptian diplomat who traveled to Dongola when Makuria was at the height of its power in the 10th century and left a detailed account.

The Nubians were a literate society, and a fair body of writing survives from the period. These documents were written in the Old Nubian language in an uncial variety of the Greek alphabet extended with some Coptic symbols and some symbols unique to Nubian. Written in a language that is closely related to the modern Nobiin tongue, these documents have long been deciphered. However, the vast majority of them are works dealing with religion or legal records that are of little use to historians. The largest known collection, found at Qasr Ibrim, does contain some valuable governmental records.

The construction of the Aswan High Dam in 1964 threatened to flood what had once been the northern half of Makuria. In 1960, UNESCO launched a massive effort to do as much archaeological work as possible before the flooding occurred. Thousands of experts were brought from around the world over the next few years. Some of the more important Makurian sites looked at were the city of Faras and its cathedral, excavated by a team from Poland; the British work at Qasr Ibrim; and the University of Ghana's work at the town of Debeira West, which gave important information on daily life in medieval Nubia. All of these sites are in what was Nobatia; the only major archaeological site in Makuria itself is the partial exploration of the capital at Old Dongola.

History

Early period (5th–8th century)

By the early 4th century, if not before, the Kingdom of Kush with its capital Meroe was collapsing. The region which would later constitute Makuria, i.e. the Nile Valley between the third Nile cataract and the great Nile bend of the fourth/fifth cataract, has been proposed to have seceded from Kush already in the 3rd century. Here, a homogenous and relatively isolated culture dubbed as "pre-Makuria" developed. During the 4th and 5th centuries, the region of Napata, located near the fourth cataract and formerly being one of the most important political and sacred places of Kush, served as the center for a new regional elite buried in large tumuli like those at el Zuma or Tanqasi. There was a significant population growth accompanied by social transformations, resulting in the absorption of the Kushites into the Nubians, a people originally from Kordofan that had settled in the Nile Valley in the 4th century. Thus, a new Makurian society and state emerged by the 5th century. In the late 5th century one of the first Makurian kings moved the power base of the still-developing kingdom from Napata to further downstream, where the fortress of Dongola, the new seat of the royal court, was founded and which soon developed a vast urban district. Many more fortresses were built along the banks of the Nile, probably not intended to serve a military purpose, but to foster urbanization.

Already at the time of the foundation of Dongola contacts were maintained with the Byzantine Empire. In the 530s, the Byzantines under Emperor Justinian mounted a policy of expansion. The Nubians were part of his plan to win allies against the Sasanian Persians by converting them to Christianity, the Byzantine state religion. The imperial court, however, was divided in two sects, believing in two different natures of Jesus Christ: Justinian belonged to the Chalcedonians, the official denomination of the empire, while his wife Theodora was a Miaphysite, who were the strongest in Egypt. John of Ephesus described how two competing missions were sent to Nubia, with the Miaphysite arriving first in, and converting, the northern kingdom of Nobatia in 543. While the Nobatian king refused Justinian's mission to travel further south archaeological records might suggest that Makuria converted still in the first half of the 6th century. The chronicler John of Biclar recorded that in around 568 Makuria had “received the faith of Christ”. In 573 a Makurian delegation arrived in Constantinople, offering ivory and a giraffe and declaring its good relationship with the Byzantines. Unlike Nobatia in the north (with which Makuria seemed to have been in enmity) and Alodia in the south Makuria embraced the Chalcedonian doctrine. The early ecclesiastical architecture at Dongola confirms the close relations maintained with the empire, trade between the two states was flourishing.

In the 7th century, Makuria annexed its northern neighbour Nobatia. While there are several contradicting theories, it seems likely that this occurred soon after the Sasanian occupation of Egypt, presumably during the 620s, but before 642. Before the Sasanian invasion, Nobatia used to have strong ties with Egypt and was thus hit hard by its fall. Perhaps it was also invaded by the Sasanians itself: some local churches from that period show traces of destruction and subsequent rebuilding. Thus weakened, Nobatia fell to Makuria, making Makuria extend as far north as Philae near the first cataract. A new bishopric was founded in Faras in around 630 and two new cathedrals styled after the basilica of Dongola were built in Faras and Qasr Ibrim. It is not known what happened to the royal Nobatian family after the unification, but it is recorded that Nobatia remained a separate entity within the unified kingdom governed by an Eparch.

Between 639 and 641 the Muslim Arabs overran Byzantine Egypt. A Byzantine request for help remained unanswered by the Nubians due to conflicts with the Beja. In 641 or 642 the Arabs sent a first expedition into Makuria. While it is not clear how far south it penetrated it was eventually defeated. A second invasion led by Abdallah abi Sarh followed in 651/652, when the attackers pushed as far south as Dongola. Dongola was besieged and bombarded by catapults. While they damaged parts of the town they could not penetrate the walls of the citadel. Muslim sources highlight the skill of the Nubian archers in repelling the invasion. With both sides being unable to decide the battle in their favour, abi Sarh and the Makurian king Qalidurut eventually met and drew up a treaty known as Baqt. Initially it was a ceasefire also containing an annual exchange of goods (Makurian slaves for Egyptian wheat, textiles etc.), an exchange typical for historical North East African states and perhaps being a continuation of terms already existing between the Nubians and Byzantines. Probably in Umayyad times the treaty was expanded by regulating the safety of Nubians in Egypt and Muslims in Makuria. While some modern scholars view the Baqt as a submission of Makuria to the Muslims it is clear that it was not: the exchanged goods were of equal value and Makuria was recognized as an independent state, being one of the few to beat back the Arabs during the early Islamic expansion. The Baqt would remain in force for more than six centuries, although at times interrupted by mutual raids.

The 8th century was a period of consolidation. Under king Merkurios, who lived in the late 7th and early 8th century and whom the Coptic biograph John the Deacon approvingly refers to as “the new Constantine”, the state seems to have been reorganized and Miaphysite Christianity to have become the official creed. He probably also founded the monumental Ghazali monastery (around 5000 m2) in Wadi Abu Dom. Zacharias, Merkurios' son and successor, renounced his claim to the throne and went into a monastery, but maintained the right to proclaim a successor. Within a few years there were three different kings and several Muslim raids until before 747, the throne was seized by Kyriakos. In that year, John the Deacon claims, the Umayyad governour of Egypt imprisoned the Coptic Patriarch, resulting in a Makurian invasion and siege of Fustat, the Egyptian capital, after which the Patriarch was released. This episode has been referred to as “Christian Egyptian propaganda”, although it is still likely that Upper Egypt was subject to a Makurian campaign, perhaps a raid. Nubian influence in Upper Egypt would remain strong. Three years later, in 750, the sons of Marwan II, the last Umayyad Caliph, fled to Nubia and asked Kyriakos for asylum, although without success. In around 760 Makuria was probably visited by the Chinese traveller Du Huan.

Zenith (9th–11th century)

The kingdom was at its peak between the 9th and 11th centuries. During the reign of king Ioannes in the early 9th century, relations with Egypt were cut and the Baqt ceased to be paid. Upon Ioannes' death in 835 an Abbasid emissary arrived, demanding the Makurian payment of the missing 14 annual payments and threatening with war if the demands are not met. Thus confronted with a demand for more than 5000 slaves, Zakharias III "Augustus", the new king, had his son Georgios I crowned king, probably to increase his prestige, and sent him to the caliph in Baghdad to negotiate. His travel drew much attention at the time. The 12th century Syriac Patriarch Michael described Georgios and his retinue in some detail, writing that Georgios rode a camel, wielded a sceptre and a golden cross in his hands and that a red umbrella was carried over his head. He was accompanied by a bishop, horsemen and slaves, and to his left and right were young men wielding crosses. A few months after he arrived in Baghdad Georgios I, who was described as educated and well-mannered, managed to convince the caliph of remitting the Nubian debts and reducing the Baqt payments to a 3-year rhythm. In 836 or early 837 he had returned to Nubia. After his return a new church was built in Dongola, the Cruciform Church, which had an approximate height of 28m and came to be the largest building in the entire kingdom. A new palace, the so-called Throne Hall of Dongola, was also built, showing strong Byzantine influences.

In 831 a punitive campaign of the Abbasid Caliph al-Mutasim defeated the Beja east of Nubia. As a result, they had to submit to the Caliph, thus expanding nominal Muslim authority over much of the Sudanese Eastern Desert. In 834 al-Mutasim ordered that the Egyptian Arab Bedouins, who had been declining as a military force since the rise of the Abbasids, were not to receive any more payments. Discontented and dispossessed, they pushed southwards. The road into Nubia was, however, blocked by Makuria: while there existed communities of Arab settlers in Lower Nubia the great mass of the Arab nomads was forced to settle among the Beja, driven also by the motivation to exploit the local gold mines. In the mid-9th century the Arab adventurer al-Umari hired a private army and settled at a mine near Abu Hamad in eastern Makuria. After a confrontation between both parties, al-Umari occupied Makurian territories along the Nile. King Georgios I sent an elite force commanded by his son in law, Nyuti, but he failed to defeat the Arabs and rebelled against the crown himself. King Georgios then sent his oldest son, presumably the later Georgios II, but he was abandoned by his army and was forced to flee to Alodia. The Makurian king then sent another son, Zacharias, who worked together with al-Umari to kill Nyuti before eventually defeating al-Umari himself and pushing him into the desert. Afterward, al-Umari attempted to establish himself in Lower Nubia, but was soon pushed out again before finally being murdered during the reign of the Tulunid Sultan Ahmad ibn Tulun (868-884).

During the rule of the Ikhshidid dynasty, relations between Makuria and Egypt worsened: in 951 a Makurian army marched against Egypt's Kharga Oasis, killing and enslaving many people. Five years later the Makurians attacked Aswan, but were subsequently chased as far south as Qasr Ibrim. A new Makurian attack on Aswan followed immediately, which was answered by another Egyptian retaliation, this time capturing Qasr Ibrim. This did not put a hold on Makurian aggression and in 962–964 they again attacked, this time pushing as far north as Akhmim. Parts of Upper Egypt apparently remained occupied by Makuria for several years. Ikhshidid Egypt eventually fell in 969, when it was conquered by the Shiite Fatimids. Immediately afterward they sent the emissary Ibn Selim el-Aswani to the Makurian king Georgios III. Georgios accepted the first request of the emissary, the resumption of the Baqt, but declined the second one, the conversion to Islam, after a lengthy discussion with his bishops and learned men and instead invited the Fatimid governor to embrace Christianity. Afterward, he granted al-Aswani to celebrate Eid al-Adha outside of Dongola with drums and trumpets, though not without the discontent of some of his subjects. Relations between Makuria and Fatmid Egypt were to remain peaceful, as the Fatimids needed the Nubians as allies against their Sunni enemies.

The kingdom of Makuria was, at least temporarily, exercising influence over the Nubian-speaking populations of Kordofan, the region between the Nile Valley and Darfur, as is suggested by an account of the 10th century traveller Ibn Hawqal as well as oral traditions. With the southern Nubian kingdom of Alodia, with which Makuria shared its border somewhere between Abu Hamad and the Nile-Atbara confluence, Makuria seemed to have maintained a dynastic union, as according to the accounts of Arab geographers from the 10th century and Nubian sources from the 12th century. Archaeological evidence shows an increased Makurian influence on Alodian art and architecture from the 8th century. Meanwhile, evidence for contact with Christian Ethiopia is surprisingly scarce. An exceptional case was the mediation of Georgios III between Patriarch Philotheos and some Ethiopian monarch, perhaps the late Aksumite emperor Anbessa Wudem or his successor Dil Ne’ad. Ethiopian monks travelled through Nubia to reach Jerusalem, a graffito from the church of Sonqi Tino testifies its visit by an Ethiopian abuna. Such travellers also transmitted knowledge of Nubian architecture, which influenced several medieval Ethiopian churches.

During the second half of the 11th century, Makuria saw great cultural and religious reforms, referred to as "Nubization". The main initiator has been suggested to have been Georgios, the archbishop of Dongola and hence the head of the Makurian church. He seems to have popularized the Nubian language as written language to counter the growing influence of Arabic in the Coptic Church and introduced the cult of dead rulers and bishops as well as indigenous Nubian saints. A new, unique church was built in Banganarti, probably becoming one of the most important ones in the entire kingdom. In the same period Makuria also began to adopt a new royal dress and regalia and perhaps also Nubian terminology in administration and titles, all suggested to have initially come from Alodia in the south.

Decline (12th century–1365)

In 1171 Saladin overthrew the Fatimid dynasty, which signaled new hostilities between Egypt and Nubia. The following year, a Makurian army pillaged Aswan and advanced even further north. It is not clear if this campaign was intended to aid the Fatimids or was merely a raid exploiting the unstable situation in Egypt, although the latter seems more likely, as the Makurians apparently soon withdrew. To deal with the Nubians, Saladin sent his brother Turan-Shah. The latter conquered Qasr Ibrim in January 1173, reportedly sacking it, taking many prisoners, pillaging the church and converting it into a mosque. Afterward, he sent an emissary to the Makurian king, Moses Georgios, intending to answer a previously requested peace treaty with a pair of arrows. Probably ruling over both Makuria and Alodia, Moses Georgios was a man confident in his ability to resist the Egyptians, stamping with hot iron a cross on the emissary's hand. Turan Shah withdrew from Nubia but left a detachment of Kurdish troops in Qasr Ibrim, which would raid Lower Nubia for the next two years. Archaeological evidence links them with the destruction of the cathedral of Faras, Abdallah Nirqi and Debeira West. In 1175 a Nubian army finally arrived to confront the invaders at Adindan. Before battle, however, the Kurdish commander drowned while crossing the Nile, resulting in the retreat of Saladin's troops out of Nubia. Afterwards there was peace for another 100 years.

There are no records from travelers to Makuria from 1172 to 1268, and the events of this period have long been a mystery, although modern discoveries have shed some light on this era. During this period Makuria seems to have entered a steep decline. The best source on this is Ibn Khaldun, writing in the 14th century, who blamed it on Bedouin invasions similar to what the Mamluks were dealing with. Other factors for the decline of Nubia might have been the change of African trade routes and a severe dry period between 1150 and 1500.

Matters would change with the rise of the Mamluks and Sultan Baybars in 1260. In 1265 a Mamluk army allegedly raided Makuria as far south as Dongola while also expanding southwards along the African Red Sea coast, thus threatening the Nubians. In 1272 king David marched east and attacked the port town of Aidhab, located on an important pilgrimage route to Mecca. The Nubian army destroyed the town, causing “a blow to the very heart of Islam”. A punitive Mamluk expedition was sent in response, but did not pass beyond the second cataract. Three years later the Makurians attacked and destroyed Aswan, but this time Mamluk Sultan Baybars responded with a well-equipped army setting off from Cairo in early 1276, accompanied by a cousin of king David named Mashkouda or Shekanda. The Mamluks defeated the Nubians in three battles at Gebel Adda, Meinarti and finally at the Battle of Dongola. David fled upstream the Nile, eventually entering al-Abwab in the south, which, previously being Alodia's northernmost province, had by this period apparently become a kingdom of its own. The king of al-Abwab, however, handed David over to Baybars, who had him executed.

Thanks to the crusades, western Europe grew increasingly aware of the existence of Christian Nubia during the 12th and 13th centuries until in the early 14th century, there were even proposals to ally with the Nubians for another crusade against the Mamluks. Nubian characters also start to be featured in crusader songs, first displayed as Muslims and later, after the 12th century and with increasing knowledge of Nubia, as Christians. Contacts between crusaders and western pilgrims on the one side and Nubians on the other occurred in Jerusalem, where European accounts from the 12th-14th centuries attest the existence of a Nubian community, and also, if not primarily in Egypt, where many Nubians were living and where European merchants were highly active. Perhaps there also existed a Nubian community in crusader-controlled Famagusta, Cyprus. In the mid-14th century pilgrim Niccolò da Poggibonsi claimed that the Nubians had sympathies for the Latins and hence the Mamluk Sultan did not allow Latins to travel to Nubia as he was afraid that they might ignite the Nubians to war, although in the contemporary Book of Knowledge of All Kingdoms it was written that Genoese traders were present in Dongola. In Qasr Ibrim there was found a text apparently mixing Nubian with Italian as well as a Catalan playing card, and in Banganarti there has been noted an inscription written in Provencal dating to the second half of the 13th century/14th century.

Internal difficulties seem to have also hurt the kingdom. King David's cousin Shekanda claimed the throne and traveled to Cairo to seek the support of the Mamluks. They agreed and took over Nubia in 1276, and placed Shekanda on the throne. The Christian Shekanda then signed an agreement making Makuria a vassal of Egypt, and a Mamluk garrison was stationed in Dongola. A few years later, Shamamun, another member of the Makurian royal family, led a rebellion against Shekanda to restore Makurian independence. He eventually defeated the Mamluk garrison and took the throne in 1286 after separating from Egypt and betraying the peace deal. He offered the Egyptians an increase in the annual Baqt payments in return for scrapping the obligations to which Shekanda had agreed. The Mamluk armies were occupied elsewhere, and the Sultan of Egypt agreed to this new arrangement.

After a period of peace, King Karanbas defaulted on these payments, and the Mamluks again occupied the kingdom in 1312. This time, a Muslim member of the Makurian dynasty was placed on the throne. Sayf al-Din Abdullah Barshambu began converting the nation to Islam and in 1317 the throne hall of Dongola was turned into a mosque. This was not accepted by other Makurian leaders and the nation fell into civil war and anarchy that very year. Barshambu was eventually killed and succeeded by Kanz ad-Dawla. While ruling, his tribe, the Banu Khanz, acted a puppet dynasty of the Mamluks. The already mentioned king Keranbes tried to wrestle control from Kanz ad-Dwala in 1323 and eventually seized Dongola, but was ousted just one year later. He retreated to Aswan for another chance to seize the throne, but it never came.

The ascension of the Muslim king Abdallah Barshambu and his transformation of the throne hall into a mosque has often been interpreted as the end of Christian Makuria. This is conclusion is erroneous, since Christianity evidently remained vital in Nubia. While not much is known about the following decades, it seems that there were both Muslim and Christian kings on the Makurian throne. Both the traveller Ibn Battuta and the Egyptian historian Shihab al-Umari claim that the contemporary Makurian kings were Muslims belonging to the Banu Khanz, while the general population remained Christian. Al-Umari also points out that Makuria was still dependent on the Mamluk Sultan. On the other hand, he also remarks that the Makurian throne was seized in turns by Muslims and Christians. Indeed, an Ethiopian monk who travelled through Nubia in around 1330, Gadla Ewostatewos, states that the Nubian king, which he claims to have met in person, was Christian. In the Book of Knowledge of All Kingdoms, which relies on an anonymous traveller from the mid-14th century, it is claimed that the "Kingdom of Dongola" was inhabited by Christians and that its royal banner was a cross on white background (see flag). Epigraphical evidence reveals the names of three Makurian kings: Siti and Abdallah Kanz ad-Dawla, both ruling during the 1330s, and Paper, who is dated to the mid 14th century. The attestations of Siti's reign, all Nubian in nature, show that he still exercised control/influence over a vast territory from Lower Nubia to Kordofan, suggesting that his kingdom entered the second half of the 14th century centralized, powerful and Christian.

It was also in the mid 14th century, more particular after 1347, when Nubia would have been devastated by the plague. Archaeology confirms a rapid decline of the Christian Nubian civilization since then. Due to the in general rather small population the plague might have cleansed entire landscapes from its Nubian inhabitants.

In 1365, there occurred yet another short, but disastrous civil war. The current king was killed in battle by his rebelling nephew, who had allied himself with the Banu Ja'd tribe. The brother of the murdered king and his retinue fled to a town called Daw in the Arabic sources, most likely identical with Gebel Adda in Lower Nubia. The usurper then killed the nobility of the Banu Ja'd, probably because he could not trust them anymore, and destroyed and pillaged Dongola, just to travel to Gebel Adda and ask his uncle for forgiveness afterward. Thus Dongola was left to the Banu Ja'd and Gebel Adda became the new capital.

Terminal period (1365–late 15th century)

The Makurian rump state

Both the usurper and the rightful heir, and most likely even the king that was killed during the usurpation, were Christian. Now residing in Gebel Adda, the Makurian kings continued their Christian traditions. They ruled over a reduced rump state with a confirmed north–south extension of around 100 km, albeit it might have been larger in reality. Located in such a strategically irrelevant periphery, the Mamluks left the kingdom alone. In the sources this kingdom appears as Dotawo. Until recently it was commonly assumed that Dotawo was, before the Makurian court shifted its seat to Gebel Adda, just a vasal kingdom of Makuria, but it is now accepted that it was merely the Old Nubian self-designation for Makuria.

The last known king is Joel, who is mentioned in a 1463 document and in an inscription from 1484. Perhaps it was under Joel when the kingdom witnessed a last, brief renaissance. After the death or deposition of king Joel the kingdom might have collapsed. The cathedral of Faras came out of use after the 15th century, just as Qasr Ibrim was abandoned by the late 15th century. The palace of Gebel Adda came out of use after the 15th century as well. In 1518, there is one last mention of a Nubian ruler, albeit it is unknown where he resided and if he was Christian or Muslim. There were no traces of an independent Christian kingdom when the Ottomans occupied Lower Nubia in the 1560s, while the Funj had come into possession of Upper Nubia south of the third cataract.

Further developments

Political
By the early 15th century, there is mention of a king of Dongola, most likely independent from the influence of the Egyptian sultans. Friday prayers held in Dongola failed to mention them as well. These new kings of Dongola were probably confronted with waves of Arab migrations and thus were too weak to conquer the Makurian splinter state of Lower Nubia.

It is possible that some petty kingdoms that continued the Christian Nubian culture developed in the former Makurian territory, like for example on Mograt island, north of Abu Hamed. Another small kingdom would have been the Kingdom of Kokka, founded perhaps in the 17th century in the no-mans-land between the Ottoman Empire in the north and the Funj in the south. Its organization and rituals bore clear similarities to those of Christian times. Eventually the kings themselves were Christians until the 18th century.

In 1412, the Awlad Kenz took control of Nubia and part of Egypt above the Thebaid.

Ethnographic and linguistic

The Nubians upstream of Al Dabbah started to assume an Arabic identity and the Arabic language, eventually becoming the Ja'alin, claimed descendants of Abbas, uncle of Muhammad. The Ja'alin were already mentioned by David Reubeni, who travelled through Nubia in the early 16th century. They are now divided into several sub-tribes, which are, from Al Dabbah to the conjunction of the Blue and White Nile: Shaiqiya, Rubatab, Manasir, Mirafab and the "Ja'alin proper". Among them, Nubian remained a spoken language until the 19th century. North of the Al Dabbah developed three Nubian sub-groups: The Kenzi, who, before the completion of the Aswan Dam, lived between Aswan and Maharraqa, the Mahasi, who settled between Maharraqa and Kerma and the Danagla, the southernmost of the remaining Nile Valley Nubians. Some count the Danagla to the Ja'alin, since the Danagla also claim to belong to that Arab tribe, but they in fact still speak a Nubian language, Dongolawi. North Kordofan, which was still a part of Makuria as late as the 1330s, also underwent a linguistic Arabization similar to the Nile Valley upstream of Al Dabbah. Historical and linguistic evidence confirms that the locals were predominantly Nubian-speaking until the 19th century, with a language closely related to the Nile-Nubian dialects.

Today, the Nubian language is in the process of being replaced by Arabic. Furthermore, the Nubians increasingly start to claim to be Arabs descending from Abbas, thus disregarding their Christian Nubian past.

Culture
Christian Nubia was long considered something of a backwater, mainly because its graves were small and lacking the grave goods of previous eras. Modern scholars realize that this was due to cultural reasons, and that the Makurians actually had a rich and vibrant art and culture.

Languages 

Four languages were used in Makuria: Nubian, Coptic, Greek and Arabic. Nubian was represented by two dialects, with Nobiin being said to have been spoken in the Nobadia province in the north and Dongolawi in the Makurian heartland, although in the Islamic period Nobiin is also attested to have been employed by the Shaigiya tribe in the southeastern Dongola Reach. 
The royal court employed Nobiin despite being located in Dongolawi-speaking territory. By the eight century Nobiin had been codified based on the Coptic alphabet, but it was not until the 11th century when Nobiin had established itself as language of administrative, economic and religious documents. The rise of Nobiin overlapped with the decline of the Coptic language in both Makuria and Egypt. It has been suggested that before the rise of Nobiin as literary language, Coptic served as official administrative language, but this seems doubtful; Coptic literary remains are virtually absent in the Makurian heartland. In Nobadia, however, Coptic was fairly widespread, probably even serving as a lingua franca. Coptic also served as the language of communication with Egypt and the Coptic Church. Coptic refugees escaping Islamic persecution settled in Makuria, while Nubian priests and bishops would have studied in Egyptian monasteries. Greek, the third language, was of great prestige and used in religious context, but does not seem to have been actually spoken, making it a dead language (similar to Latin in medieval Europe). 
Lastly, Arabic was used from the 11th and 12th centuries, superseding Coptic as language of commerce and diplomatic correspondences with Egypt. Furthermore, Arab traders and settlers were present in northern Nubia, although the spoken language of the latter appears to have gradually shifted from Arabic to Nubian.

Arts

Wallpaintings 
As of 2019, around 650 murals distributed over 25 sites have been recorded, with more paintings still awaiting publication. One of the most important discoveries of the rushed work prior to the flooding of Lower Nubia was the Cathedral of Faras. This large building had been completely filled with sand preserving a series of magnificent paintings. Similar, but less well preserved, paintings have been found at several other sites in Makuria, including palaces and private homes, giving an overall impression of Makurian art. The style and content was heavily influenced by Byzantine art, and also showed influence from Egyptian Coptic art and from Palestine. Mainly religious in nature, it depicts many of the standard Christian scenes. Also illustrated are a number of Makurian kings and bishops, with noticeably darker skin than the Biblical figures.

Manuscript illustrations

Pottery 
Nubian pottery in this period is also notable. Shinnie refers to it as the "richest indigenous pottery tradition on the African continent." Scholars divide the pottery into three eras. The early period, from 550 to 650 according to Adams, or to 750 according to Shinnie, saw fairly simple pottery similar to that of the late Roman Empire. It also saw much of Nubian pottery imported from Egypt rather than produced domestically. Adams feels this trade ended with the invasion of 652; Shinnie links it to the collapse of Umayyad rule in 750. After this domestic production increased, with a major production facility at Faras. In this middle era, which lasted until around 1100, the pottery was painted with floral and zoomorphic scenes and showed distinct Umayyad and even Sassanian influences. The late period during Makuria's decline saw domestic production again fall in favour of imports from Egypt. Pottery produced in Makuria became less ornate, but better control of firing temperatures allowed different colours of clay.

Role of women

The Christian Nubian society was matrilineal and women enjoyed a high social standing. The matrilineal succession gave the queen mother and the sister of the current king as forthcoming queen mother great political relevance. This importance is attested by the fact that she constantly appears in legal documents. Another female political title was the asta ("daughter"), perhaps some type of provincial representative.

Women had access to education and there is evidence that, like in Byzantine Egypt, female scribes existed. Private land tenure was open to both men and women, meaning that both could own, buy and sell land. Transfers of land from mother to daughter were common. They could also be the patrons of churches and wall paintings. Inscriptions from the cathedral of Faras indicate that around every second wall painting had a female sponsor.

Hygiene
Latrines were a common sight in Nubian domestic buildings. In Dongola all houses had ceramic toilets. Some houses in Cerra Matto (Serra East) featured privies with ceramic toilets, which were connected to a small chamber with a stone-lined clean out window to the outside and a brick ventilation flue. Biconical pieces of clay served as the equivalent of toilet paper.

One house in Dongola featured a vaulted bathroom, fed by a system of pipes attached to a water tank. A furnace heated up both the water and the air, which was circulated into the richly decorated bathroom via flues in the walls. The monastic complex of Hambukol is thought to have had a room serving as a steam bath. The Ghazali monastery in Wadi Abu Dom also might have featured several bathrooms.

Government

Makuria was a monarchy ruled by a king based in Dongola. The king was also considered a priest and could perform mass. How succession was decided is not clear. Early writers indicate it was from father to son. After the 11th century, however, it seems clear that Makuria was using the uncle-to-sister's-son system favoured for millennia in Kush. Shinnie speculates that the later form may have actually been used throughout, and that the early Arab writers merely misunderstood the situation and incorrectly described Makurian succession as similar to what they were used to. A Coptic source from the mid 8th century refers to king Cyriacos as "orthodox Abyssinian king of Makuria" as well as "Greek king", with "Abyssinian" probably reflecting the Miaphysite Coptic church and "Greek" the Byzantine Orthodox one. In 1186 king Moses Georgios called himself "king of Alodia, Makuria, Nobadia, Dalmatia and Axioma."

Little is known about government below the king. A wide array of officials, generally using Byzantine titles, are mentioned, but their roles are never explained. One figure who is well-known, thanks to the documents found at Qasr Ibrim, is the Eparch of Nobatia, who seems to have been the viceroy in that region after it was annexed to Makuria. The Eparch's records make clear that he was also responsible for trade and diplomacy with the Egyptians. Early records make it seem like the Eparch was appointed by the king, but later ones indicate that the position had become hereditary. The elite of Makuria was drawn from noblemen who the Islamic sources called "princes". It was them who constituted the courtiers, military commanders and bishops. They were apparently powerful enough to openly exlaim their discontent and even depose the ruler if they were unhappy with him, despite claims in Islamic sources that the power of the Makurian king was absolute. A selected few of them, the elders, constituted a council that assisted the king in his decision making. The elders aside it was also the queenmother who bore a key role in advising the king. In 1292 an unnamed Makurian king is even reported to have claimed that "it was only the women who direct the kings [...]"

The bishops might have played a role in the governance of the state. Ibn Selim el-Aswani noted that before the king responded to his mission he met with a council of bishops. El-Aswani described a highly centralized state, but other writers state that Makuria was a federation of thirteen kingdoms presided over by the great king at Dongola.

Kings

Religion

Paganism

One of the most debated issues among scholars is over the religion of Makuria. Up to the 5th century the old faith of Meroe seems to have remained strong, even while ancient Egyptian religion, its counterpart in Egypt, disappeared. In the 5th century the Nubians went so far as to launch an invasion of Egypt when the Christians there tried to turn some of the main temples into churches. A portion of the Nubian population seemingly remained pagan as late as the 10th century, for el-Aswani reported that "[s]ome of them do not know the Creator and adore the Sun and the Day; some others adore whatever they like; trees or animals."

Christianity

Archaeological evidence in this period finds a number of Christian ornaments in Nubia, and some scholars feel that this implies that conversion from below was already taking place. Others argue that it is more likely that these reflected the faith of the manufacturers in Egypt rather than the buyers in Nubia.

Certain conversion came with a series of 6th-century missions. The Byzantine Empire dispatched an official party to try to convert the kingdoms to Chalcedonian Christianity, but Empress Theodora reportedly conspired to delay the party to allow a group of  Miaphysites to arrive first. John of Ephesus reports that the Monophysites successfully converted the kingdoms of Nobatia and Alodia, but that Makuria remained hostile. John of Biclarum states that Makuria then embraced the rival Byzantine Christianity. Archaeological evidence seems to point to a rapid conversion brought about by an official adoption of the new faith. Millennia-old traditions such as the building of elaborate tombs, and the burying of expensive grave goods with the dead were abandoned, and temples throughout the region seem to have been converted to churches. Churches eventually were built in virtually every town and village.

After this point the exact course of Makurian Christianity is much disputed. It is clear that by ca. 710 Makuria had become officially Coptic and loyal to the Coptic Patriarch of Alexandria; the king of Makuria became the defender of the patriarch of Alexandria, occasionally intervening militarily to protect him, as Kyriakos did in 722. This same period saw Melkite Makuria absorb the Coptic Nobatia, and historians have long wondered why the conquering state adopted the religion of its rival. It is fairly clear that Egyptian Coptic influence was far stronger in the region, and that Byzantine power was fading, and this might have played a role. Historians are also divided on whether this was the end of the Melkite/Coptic split as there is some evidence that a Melkite minority persisted until the end of the kingdom.

Church infrastructure
The Makurian church was divided into seven bishoprics: Kalabsha, Qupta, Qasr Ibrim, Faras, Sai, Dongola, and Suenkur. Unlike Ethiopia, it appears that no national church was established and all seven bishops reported directly to the Coptic Patriarch of Alexandria. The bishops were appointed by the Patriarch, not the king, though they seem to have largely been local Nubians rather than Egyptians.

Monasticism

Unlike in Egypt, there is not much evidence for monasticism in Makuria. According to Adams there are only three archaeological sites that are certainly monastic. All three are fairly small and quite Coptic, leading to the possibility that they were set up by Egyptian refugees rather than indigenous Makurians. Since the 10th/11th century the Nubians had their own monastery in the Egyptian Wadi El Natrun valley.

Islam

The Baqt guaranteed the security of Muslims travelling in Makuria, but prohibited their settlement in the kingdom. The latter point was, however, not maintained: Muslim migrants, probably merchants and artisans, are confirmed to have settled in Lower Nubia from the 9th century and to have intermarried with the locals, thus laying the foundation for a small Muslim population as far south as the Batn el-Hajar. Arabic documents from Qasr Ibrim confirm that these Muslims had their own communal judiciary, but still regarded the Eparch of Nobatia as their suzerain. It seems likely that they had own mosques, but yet none has been identified archaeologically, with a possible exception being in Gebel Adda.

In Dongola, there was no larger number of Muslims until the end of the 13th century. Before that date, Muslim residents were limited to merchants and diplomats. In the late 10th century, when al-Aswani came to Dongola, there was, despite being demanded in the Baqt, still no mosque; he and around 60 other Muslims had to pray outside of the city. It is not until 1317, with the conversion of the throne hall by Abdallah Barshambu, when a mosque is firmly attested. While the Jizya, the Islamic head tax enforced on non-Muslims, was established after the Mamluk invasion of 1276 and Makuria was periodically governed by Muslim kings since Abdallah Barshambu, the majority of the Nubians remained Christian. The actual Islamization of Nubia began in the late 14th century, with the arrival of the first in a series of Muslim teachers propagating Islam.

Economy

The main economic activity in Makuria was agriculture, with farmers growing several crops a year of barley, millet, and dates. The methods used were generally the same that had been used for millennia. Small plots of well irrigated land were lined along the banks of the Nile, which would be fertilized by the river's annual flooding. One important technological advance was the saqiya, an oxen-powered water wheel, that was introduced in the Roman period and helped increase yields and population density. Settlement patterns indicate that land was divided into individual plots rather than as in a manorial system. The peasants lived in small villages composed of clustered houses of sun-dried brick.

Important industries included the production of pottery, based at Faras, and weaving based at Dongola. Smaller local industries include leatherworking, metalworking, and the widespread production of baskets, mats, and sandals from palm fibre. Also important was the gold mined in the Red Sea Hills to the east of Makuria.

Cattle was of great economic importance. Perhaps their breeding and marketing was controlled by the central administration. A great assemblage of 13th century cattle bones from Old Dongola has been linked with a mass slaughter by the invading Mamluks, who attempted to weaken the Makurian economy.

Makurian trade was largely by barter as the state never adopted a currency. In the north, however, Egyptian coins were common. Makurian trade with Egypt was of great importance. From Egypt a wide array of luxury and manufactured goods were imported. The main Makurian export was slaves. The slaves sent north were not from Makuria itself, but rather from further south and west in Africa. Little is known about Makurian trade and relations with other parts of Africa. There is some archaeological evidence of contacts and trade with the areas to the west, especially Kordofan. Additionally, contacts to Darfur and Kanem-Bornu seem probable, but there are only few evidences. There seem to have been important political relations between Makuria and Christian Ethiopia to the south-east. For instance, in the 10th century, Georgios II successfully intervened on behalf of the unnamed ruler at that time, and persuaded Patriarch Philotheos of Alexandria to at last ordain an abuna, or metropolitan, for the Ethiopian Orthodox Church. However, there is little evidence of much other interaction between the two Christian states.

See also
List of rulers of Makuria
History of Sudan

Annotations

Notes

References

Further reading

External links
History of Sudan at Encyclopedia of the Orient

 
History of Nubia
History of Sudan
Countries in medieval Africa
Former monarchies of Africa
Christianity in the Middle Ages
Coptic Orthodox Church
Medieval Islamic world
Spread of Islam
Nubia
Former countries